Jeff McVean (born 21 December 1954) is an Australian former equestrian. He competed at the 1984 Summer Olympics and the 1988 Summer Olympics.

References

External links
 

1954 births
Living people
Australian male equestrians
Olympic equestrians of Australia
Equestrians at the 1984 Summer Olympics
Equestrians at the 1988 Summer Olympics
Place of birth missing (living people)